Valérie Bazin-Malgras (born 31 October 1969) is a French politician of The Republicans (LR) who has been serving as a member of the French National Assembly since 2017, representing Aube's 2nd constituency.

Early life 
For more than 20 years, she managed the Villeroy & Boch company stores in Troyes. In this position, she became France director of factory outlets for Villeroy and Boch in 2003 and President of the Association of Traders of Brands Avenue Troyes.

Political career

In Parliament, Bazin-Malgras serves on the Committee on Cultural Affairs and Education. In addition to her committee assignments, she is part of the French-Singaporean Parliamentary Friendship Group.

Since 2019, Bazin-Malgras has been serving as deputy chairperson of the Republicans, under the leadership of chair Christian Jacob.

See also
 2017 French legislative election

References

1969 births
Living people
People from Romilly-sur-Seine
The Republicans (France) politicians
Deputies of the 15th National Assembly of the French Fifth Republic
Deputies of the 16th National Assembly of the French Fifth Republic
Members of Parliament for Aube
Women members of the National Assembly (France)
21st-century French women politicians
Politicians from Grand Est